Kazakovka may refer to:

Kazakovka, Nizhny Novgorod Oblast, a village (selo) in Nizhny Novgorod Oblast, Russia
Kazakovka, Tula Oblast, a village in Tula Oblast, Russia
Kazakovka, name of several other rural localities in Russia